"Patty Cake" is a song recorded by American rapper Kodak Black. It was released via Atlantic Records on August 9, 2017. Included in Black's debut studio album Painting Pictures, it was described as a "bouncy piano driven track" by Complex Magazine.

Music video 
The official music video has received over 79 million views on YouTube as of May 9, 2021. It was directed by Michael Garcia, animated by Kimson Albert, produced by Shiri Fauer and Bruno Biel, and edited by Carlos Gonzalez.

The video, featuring Black as "an animated cartoon attending a high school", shows students attending school, at where Black appears as a cartoon figure. He appears in the class, standing on a desk in the room while campaigning himself to become the school's homecoming king. At the school dance, Black arrives wearing a red suit and gold chains. There, he goes on the stage to perform his song and eventually becomes the homecoming king. The video ends as Black is crowned and he walks away.

In popular culture

The song was used in the episode '"North Of The Border'" in the television show "Atlanta" as the opening song of the episode 

Film Location

The music video was shot at the now defunct Archbishop Curley-Norte Dame High School in the Little Haiti Neighborhood of Miami, Florida

Personnel
Ness — producer, programmer
Ben Billions — producer, programmer
Nick Seeley — co-producer, programmer, songwriter
Dieuson Octave — primary artist, vocals, songwriter
Benjamin Diehl — songwriter
Courtney Clyburn — songwriter

Charts

References

Notes

Sources 

2017 songs
Kodak Black songs
Atlantic Records singles
Hip hop songs
Songs written by Ben Billions
Songs written by Kodak Black